San Lucas Municipality may refer to:
 San Lucas Municipality, Chiapas, Mexico
 San Lucas Municipality, Michoacán, Mexico
 San Lucas Municipality, Chuquisaca, Bolivia

Municipality name disambiguation pages